The APE 4.80 is a passenger trailer wagon and was built by the Swiss manufacturer  Gebrüder  Moser + Cie and Ramseier & Jenzer + Cie, both in Bern, for  the Zugerland Verkehrsbetriebe (ZVB).

History and development

Construction of the first wagons started in 1961. The construction comes from the Ramseier & Jenzer + Cie. In 1963, ZVB had more than ten APE 4.80 passenger trailers.

In the Zugerland transport companies ZVB  (German: Zugerland Verkehrsbetrieben), the APE 4.80 were mainly used on the mountain lines Zug-Ägeri (line 1) and Zug-Menzingen (line 2) with Saurer 5 DUK buses. This first batch of APE 4.80 passenger trailers got the same blue color like the Saurer DUK 5 busses.

Around 1975/76, together with the orange-colored FBW buses (manufacturer designation FBW 91U EU4A), eight  new trailers were also produced and delivered in orange color.

All APE 4.80 have a trailer coupling, which can be used to mount single-axle or two-axle luggage trailers AGP 3. All  APE 4.80. were designed in such a way that the entrance room at the rear also functioned as a luggage compartment, these were separated from the passenger compartment by sliding doors. In the first tranche, the passenger compartment was also divided into a smoking and non-smoking section by means of an intermediate wall with a door; in the second tranche, the last eight APE 4.80, they were designed both as a non-smoking compartment. Both compartments were equipped with light brown leather seats.  APE 4.80  number 28 (ex. Number 3) of the ZVB is located in the Zug depot technology history (German: Zuger Depot Technikgeschichte).

Technical specifications 
 Total length 
 Vehicle width 
 Height 
 Seating capacity 40
 Standing places 40
 Wheelbase 
 Total weight 
 Brake control Compressed air, hydraulics

References
Zuger Depot Technikgeschichte
 Sandro Sigrist: Elektrische Strassenbahnen im Kanton Zug. Prellbock, Leissigen 1997, 

Articulated buses
Full-size buses
Transport in the canton of Zug